The Council of Ministers (Ministerski savet) is the main authority of the executive power in the Republic of Bulgaria. It consists of the Prime Minister of Bulgaria and all the specialized ministers.

Overview 
After the compositions of the Council of Ministers is decided by the newly elected government, the deputies who are chosen to become ministers temporarily lose their deputy rights while being ministers. These rights are restored in case they are released from the Council of Ministers or the government falls from power. This is in contrast to how deputy ministers and other government officials are treated when they are elected as deputies.

Sometimes, with the purpose of preserving the political representation of different parties or groups in the Council of Ministers, one or more ministers without portfolio (lacking a ministry of  own) may be appointed.

The Council of Ministers office is in central Sofia and is part of the Largo architectural ensemble.

Structure of the Cabinet

On August 2, 2022, President Rumen Radev appointed an interim Government. The composition of the Government is as follows:

References

External links 
 Council of Ministers official website    

 
Politics of Bulgaria
Bulgaria politics-related lists

European governments
Bulgaria